Krasnoglinsky constituency (No.160) is a Russian legislative constituency in Samara Oblast. The constituency was created in 2016 and now it covers northern Samara and northern Samara Oblast. In 1993-2007 northern Samara was placed into Promyshlenny constituency, while predominantly rural northern Samara Oblast was a part of now dissolved Novokuybyshevsk constituency.

Members

Election results

2016

|-
! colspan=2 style="background-color:#E9E9E9;text-align:left;vertical-align:top;" |Candidate
! style="background-color:#E9E9E9;text-align:left;vertical-align:top;" |Party
! style="background-color:#E9E9E9;text-align:right;" |Votes
! style="background-color:#E9E9E9;text-align:right;" |%
|-
|style="background-color:"|
|align=left|Viktor Kazakov
|align=left|United Russia
|
|63.63%
|-
|style="background-color:"|
|align=left|Aleksey Leskin
|align=left|Communist Party
|
|8.34%
|-
|style="background-color:"|
|align=left|Roman Sinelnikov
|align=left|Liberal Democratic Party
|
|7.30%
|-
|style="background:"| 
|align=left|Svetlana Kuzmina
|align=left|Communists of Russia
|
|4.88%
|-
|style="background:"| 
|align=left|Aleksandr Razuvaev
|align=left|A Just Russia
|
|3.32%
|-
|style="background:"| 
|align=left|Vladislav Ishutin
|align=left|Yabloko
|
|1.58%
|-
|style="background:"| 
|align=left|Vladimir Avdonin
|align=left|People's Freedom Party
|
|1.47%
|-
|style="background-color:" |
|align=left|Oksana Kovnir
|align=left|The Greens
|
|1.37%
|-
|style="background-color:" |
|align=left|Vitaly Ilyin
|align=left|Civic Platform
|
|1.31%
|-
|style="background:"| 
|align=left|Eduard Pugachev
|align=left|Party of Growth
|
|1.22%
|-
|style="background-color:"|
|align=left|Aleksandra Kuzminykh
|align=left|Independent
|
|0.97%
|-
|style="background:"| 
|align=left|Valery Sintsov
|align=left|Patriots of Russia
|
|0.86%
|-
| colspan="5" style="background-color:#E9E9E9;"|
|- style="font-weight:bold"
| colspan="3" style="text-align:left;" | Total
| 
| 100%
|-
| colspan="5" style="background-color:#E9E9E9;"|
|- style="font-weight:bold"
| colspan="4" |Source:
|
|}

2021

|-
! colspan=2 style="background-color:#E9E9E9;text-align:left;vertical-align:top;" |Candidate
! style="background-color:#E9E9E9;text-align:left;vertical-align:top;" |Party
! style="background-color:#E9E9E9;text-align:right;" |Votes
! style="background-color:#E9E9E9;text-align:right;" |%
|-
|style="background-color: " |
|align=left|Viktor Kazakov (incumbent)
|align=left|United Russia
|146,172
|56.68%
|-
|style="background-color: " |
|align=left|Gennady Govorkov
|align=left|Communist Party
|37,327
|14.47%
|-
|style="background-color: " |
|align=left|Roman Sinelnikov
|align=left|Liberal Democratic Party
|13,622
|5.28%
|-
|style="background-color: " |
|align=left|Aleksey Sazonov
|align=left|A Just Russia — For Truth
|13,219
|5.13%
|-
|style="background:"| 
|align=left|Aleksey Svetly
|align=left|Communists of Russia
|
|4.03%
|-
|style="background-color: " |
|align=left|Nikita Zavtur
|align=left|New People
|9,828
|3.81%
|-
|style="background-color:" |
|align=left|Oleg Komarov
|align=left|The Greens
|7,340
|2.85%
|-
|style="background-color: " |
|align=left|Grigory Yeremeev
|align=left|Russian Party of Freedom and Justice
|5,701
|2.21%
|-
|style="background-color:"|
|align=left|Aleksandra Kuzminykh
|align=left|Independent
|
|2.07%
|-
| colspan="5" style="background-color:#E9E9E9;"|
|- style="font-weight:bold"
| colspan="3" style="text-align:left;" | Total
| 257,873
| 100%
|-
| colspan="5" style="background-color:#E9E9E9;"|
|- style="font-weight:bold"
| colspan="4" |Source:
|
|}

References 

Politics of Samara Oblast
Russian legislative constituencies